Artavis Scott (born October 12, 1994) is a former American football wide receiver. He signed with the Los Angeles Chargers after going undrafted in the 2017 NFL Draft. He played college football at Clemson. He is currently a graduate assistant coach for Clemson.

Early years
Scott attended East Lake High School in Tarpon Springs, Florida. During his high school career, he had 172 receptions for 3,035 yards and 32 touchdowns receiving, 980 yards and 14 touchdowns rushing, 5,330 all-purpose yards and 51 total touchdowns. He was rated by Rivals.com as a four-star recruit and the ninth best wide receiver in his class. He committed to Clemson University to play college football.

College career
Scott made an immediate impact as a true freshman at Clemson in 2014. In the second game of the season, he had six receptions for 164 yards and two touchdowns. In the Palmetto Bowl against South Carolina, he had 185 receiving yards and two touchdowns on seven receptions. His totals for the season were 76 receptions for 965 yards and eight touchdowns. As a sophomore in 2015, Scott played 15 games with 93 receptions, 901 receiving yards, and six touchdowns. On January 9, 2017, Scott was part of the Clemson team that defeated Alabama in the 2017 College Football Playoff National Championship by a score of 35–31. In the game, he recorded three receptions for six yards. As a junior in 2016, Scott played 15 games with 614 receiving yards and five touchdowns. After the season, Scott decided to forgo his senior year and enter the 2017 NFL Draft.

Professional career

Los Angeles Chargers
Scott signed with the Los Angeles Chargers as an undrafted free agent following the 2017 NFL Draft and was reunited with former Clemson Tigers teammate Mike Williams. He was waived on September 2, 2017 and was signed to the Chargers' practice squad the next day. He signed a reserve/future contract with the Chargers on January 2, 2018.

On September 1, 2018, Scott was placed on injured reserve.

On August 31, 2019, Scott was waived by the Chargers and was signed to the practice squad the next day. His practice squad contract with the team expired on January 6, 2020.

Indianapolis Colts
On January 10, 2020, Scott signed a reserve/future contract with the Indianapolis Colts. He was waived on September 3, 2020.

Houston Texans 
On November 18, 2020, Scott was signed to the Houston Texans' practice squad. His practice squad contract with the team expired after the season on January 11, 2021.

Saskatchewan Roughriders
On January 28, 2021, Scott signed with the Saskatchewan Roughriders of the Canadian Football League. On February 17, 2021, the Roughriders announced Scott was retiring to take a coaching opportunity.

References

External links
Clemson Tigers bio

1994 births
Living people
People from Oldsmar, Florida
Players of American football from Florida
Sportspeople from Clearwater, Florida
American football wide receivers
Clemson Tigers football players
Los Angeles Chargers players
Indianapolis Colts players
Houston Texans players
Saskatchewan Roughriders players